Fahmi Huwaidi (born 29 August 1937 in El Saff, Giza Governorate) is an Egyptian columnist. A "moderate Islamist", he writes for Al Jazeera and the Egyptian opposition newspaper Al-Dustour. He has been called "probably the most widely read Islamic political analyst".

In 2006, he stopped writing for Al-Ahram, for which he had written for 48 years, complaining that words had been omitted from his weekly column.

References

1937 births
Living people
Muslim writers
Egyptian Islamists
Egyptian journalists
International Union of Muslim Scholars members
People from Giza Governorate